Antonio Brutti (born 2 May 1945) is an Italian long-distance runner. He competed in the marathon at the 1972 Summer Olympics.

References

External links

1945 births
Living people
Athletes (track and field) at the 1972 Summer Olympics
Italian male long-distance runners
Italian male marathon runners
Olympic athletes of Italy
Athletics competitors of Centro Sportivo Carabinieri